Mercury bromide can refer to:
Mercury(I) bromide (mercurous bromide), Hg2Br2
Mercury(II) bromide (mercuric bromide), HgBr2